NA-78 Gujranwala-V is a constituency for the National Assembly of Pakistan.

Members of Parliament

2018-2022: NA-82 Gujranwala-IV

Election 2002 

General elections were held on 10 Oct 2002. Qazi Hamidullah Khan of Muttahida Majlis-e-Amal won by 39,181 votes.

Election 2008 

General elections were held on 18 Feb 2008. Khurram Dastgir Khan of PML-N won by 61,972 votes.

Election 2013 

General elections were held on 11 May 2013. Khurram Dastgir Khan of PML-N won by 105,182 votes and became the  member of National Assembly.

Election 2018 
General elections were held on 25 July 2018.

See also
NA-77 Gujranwala-IV
NA-79 Mandi Bahauddin-I

References

External links
 Election result's official website

NA-096